Lycoras may refer to:

 Lycoris, a Greek word meaning "twilight", or relating to Lyco (wolf).
 Lycorus, a son of Apollo
 Ligoras (or Kurtdağı), "Wolf Mountain" in Çaykara district of Trabzon
 Lycoris (plant) a genus of flowers.
 Napeogenes lycora, a type of butterfly
 Liquorice,  root of Glycyrrhiza glabra